Cymatioa cookae, also known as Cymatioa cooki, is a species of saltwater clam, a bivalve mollusk, that is native to southern California. It was thought to be extinct since the Pleistocene era until four specimens were found living in Santa Barbara, California, between 2018 and 2019.

Taxonomy
The name cooki was derived from the surname "Cook", as it was named after Edna T. Cook, from whose collection it was first identified.

Cymatioa cooki used to have the genus name Bornia, but the genus name was later changed to Cymatioa. The only other known species of the genus is Cymatoia electilis.

Description
It has a small, sharply pointed beak and a prodissoconch 200 µm in diameter. The shell has irregular, slightly wavy commarginal striae, or grooves, and fine, dense punctae. Its mantle is large and covers most of the outer shell surface when fully extended, but can also be mostly retracted back into the shell. Its foot is large and translucent with a bright white stripe down its length, longer than the shell when fully extended.

Similar species
The shell of C. cooki resembles Cymatoia electilis, its closest known relative. C. cooki may be differentiated by its longer posterior end and longer posterior lateral tooth. Anatomical comparisons, such as of the mantle, are unknown, as living C. electilis are not documented.

Distribution
The only known specimens of C. cooki from after the Pleistocene were found at Naples Point in south Santa Barbara County. Two specimens were photographed in 2018, one was photographed and collected in March 2019, and one was found in December 2019. All specimens were found living under low intertidal boulders, located at the seaward edge of a boulder field surrounded by Phyllospadix torreyi growth.

Rediscovery
Cymatioa cooki specimens were first discovered in Baldwin Hills, Los Angeles, when a trench was dug to install a sewer line. They were discovered in a thick deposit of fossils from the Pleistocene, estimated to be from between 36,000 and 28,000 years BP. It was thought to have been extinct until it was rediscovered, and as such it has been described as a Lazarus taxon.

Cymatioa cooki may have been undiscovered until 2018 due to possibly originating from further south, then being transported to Naples Point during marine heatwaves from 2014 to 2016.

Behavior
Cymatioa cooki moves by extending its long foot and using it to crawl.

Ecology
Cymatioa cooki may potentially have a commensal relationship with burrowing invertebrates, as two were found near burrow openings.

References

External links
WoRMS entry

Galeommatidae
Molluscs of the Pacific Ocean
Molluscs described in 1937